Wenzel Gährich (16 September 1794 in Cerhovice, Bohemia – 15 September 1864 in Berlin) was a German violinist and composer. Gährich composed numerous ballets, especially for Michel François Hoguet and Paul Taglioni. He was the Royal Ballet-music conductor in Berlin.

Selected works 
Ballet
  (Berlin 1838, Wien 1854); choreography by Paul Taglioni
 Don Quixote (Berlin c.1839); choreography by Paul Taglioni
  (Berlin 1844); choreography by Paul Taglioni
  (Berlin 1845); choreography by François Michel Hoguet
  (premiered Berlin, 10 March 1848); choreography by François Michel Hoguet after Pierre Gardel
  (Berlin 1854); choreography by François Michel Hoguet
  (Berlin); choreography by Adolphe Adam

Other stage works
 , Farce with Songs (Berlin 1848); words by David Kalisch
  (Berlin 1855)
  (Berlin 1855)
 , Vaudeville (Berlin); words by A. Heinrich v. H. Michaelson
 , Divertissement (Berlin); words by Toni Stullmüller

Instrumental music
 Sinfonie No. 1 in E major (pub. 1831)
 Concertino in G minor for viola and orchestra, Op. 2 (1831)
 Symphony No. 2 in D major, Op. 3 (pub. 1831)
 Piano Quartet in C minor, Op. 4 (pub. 1833)
  (c.1841)

References

German Romantic composers
German conductors (music)
German male conductors (music)
German classical violinists
Male classical violinists
German violinists
German male violinists
German Bohemian people
1794 births
1864 deaths
19th-century classical composers
German male classical composers
19th-century German composers
19th-century German male musicians